Wait for You may refer to:

 Wait for You (EP), a 2010 EP by The Basics
 "Wait for You" (Elliott Yamin song), 2007 
 "Wait for You" (Tom Walker song), 2020
 "Wait for You", a song by 7eventh Time Down from their 2013 album Just Say Jesus
 "Wait for You", a song by Chris Brown song from his 2012 album Fortune
 "Wait for You", a song by Nelly Furtado from her 2006 album Loose
 "Wait for You", a 2019 song by Maelyn Jarmon
 "Wait for You", a song by Odette from her 2021 album Herald
 "Wait for You", a song by Sugababes from their 2010 album Sweet 7

See also
"Wait for U", a 2022 song by Future